Andrew Hedges (16 September 1935 – 1 October 2005) was a British bobsledder. He competed in the two-man and the four-man events at the 1964 Winter Olympics. Hedges was also a successful racecar driver.

References

1935 births
2005 deaths
British male bobsledders
Olympic bobsledders of Great Britain
Bobsledders at the 1964 Winter Olympics
Sportspeople from Oxfordshire
British racing drivers